A by-election was held for the New South Wales Legislative Assembly electorate of East Maitland on 5 June 1878 because of the death of Stephen Scholey.

Dates

Result

Stephen Scholey died.

See also
Electoral results for the district of East Maitland
List of New South Wales state by-elections

References

1878 elections in Australia
New South Wales state by-elections
1870s in New South Wales